Alcides Etcheverry (born 4 September 1961) is a Uruguayan former cyclist. He competed in the road race at the 1988 Summer Olympics.

References

1961 births
Living people
Uruguayan male cyclists
Olympic cyclists of Uruguay
Cyclists at the 1988 Summer Olympics
Place of birth missing (living people)